A Horse Called Bear is a 2015 American family drama film about recently orphaned boy who inherits a horse. It was produced by Penny Carlisi and directed by Daniel Knudsen. The film was awarded the Dove seal of family approval from the Dove Foundation and was released May 26, 2015.

Plot 
A Horse Called Bear tells the story of Ethan who inherits his mother's horse after she dies unexpectedly in a car accident. Being a city kid he has no desire to own a horse and tells the lawyer managing his mother's estate to sell it. The horse was purchased by one of the ranch hands to use as a training horse for young riders. Ethan then moves across the country to live with his grandparents. While living with them he learns that the horse is still kept nearby at his uncle's horse ranch. He is hired by his uncle and begins to work at the ranch with his mom's horse "Bear." During this time he falls in love with the horse and eventually buys it back.

Cast 
 Nicholas Ryan Gibbs as Ethan Riley
 Wayne E. Brown as Otto Brown
 Austin Farnsworth as Austin Baker
 Katelyn Grace Farnsworth as Katelyn Baker
 Allison Marie Farnsworth as Allison Baker
 Dawn Storey as Gloria Brown
 Kristina Kaylen as Rachel

Ryan-Iver Klann and Daniel Knudsen also appear in the film.

Production 
Principal photography for A Horse Called Bear took place in August and September 2013. Various locations in and around Howell, Michigan were used for filming.

Release 
A Horse Called Bear premiered at the Historic Howell Theater and was released on DVD May 26, 2015.

Awards 
The film was a semifinalist for "Best Feature Film" in the 2015 Christian Worldview Film Festival. The film was also part of the official selections at the 2015 International Christian Film Festival in Orlando, Florida.

References

External links 
 Official Site
 Crystal Creek Media
 

2015 films
American drama films
Films about horses
Films about Christianity
Films shot in Michigan
American independent films
2010s English-language films
Films directed by Daniel Knudsen
2010s American films